The men's 1500 metres race of the 2015–16 ISU Speed Skating World Cup 1, arranged in the Olympic Oval, in Calgary, Alberta, Canada, was held on 15 November 2015.

Denis Yuskov of Russia won the race, while Bart Swings of Belgium came second, and Joey Mantia of the United States came third. Ted-Jan Bloemen of Canada won the Division B race.

Results
The race took place on Sunday, 15 November, with Division B scheduled in the morning session, at 10:35, and Division A scheduled in the afternoon session, at 13:12.

Division A

Note: NR = national record.

Division B

Note: NR = national record, NRJ = national record for juniors.

References

Men 1500
1